John Graham McVie (born 26 November 1945) is a British bass guitarist. He is best known as a member of the rock bands John Mayall & the Bluesbreakers from 1964 to 1967 and Fleetwood Mac since 1967. His surname, combined with that of Mick Fleetwood, was the inspiration for the band's name.

He joined Fleetwood Mac shortly after its formation by guitarist Peter Green in 1967, replacing temporary bass guitarist Bob Brunning. McVie and Fleetwood are the only two members of the group to appear on every Fleetwood Mac release, and for over fifty years have been the group's last remaining original (or almost original in McVie's case) members.

In 1968, McVie married blues pianist and singer Christine Perfect, who became a member of Fleetwood Mac two years later. John and Christine McVie divorced in 1976, but remained on good terms. During this time the band recorded the album Rumours, a major artistic and commercial success that borrowed its title from the turmoil in McVie's and other band members' marriages and relationships. 

McVie was inducted into the Rock and Roll Hall of Fame in 1998 as a member of Fleetwood Mac.

Early life
John Graham McVie was born in Ealing, west London, to Reg and Dorothy McVie and attended Walpole Grammar School. He says that he did have a sister, but she died when she was very young. John McVie started playing the trumpet at an early age then at age 14, McVie began playing the guitar in local bands, covering songs by The Shadows. He soon realised that his friends were learning lead guitar so he decided to play the bass guitar instead. Initially he just removed the top two (B and E) strings from his guitar to play the bass parts until his father bought him a pink Fender bass guitar, the same as that used by McVie's major early musical influence Jet Harris, The Shadows' bass player. McVie was in 3J class with Roger Warwick, a baritone sax player who had studied under Don Rendell and was to emerge in the London rock-jazz scene. Their teacher, Mr Howell (a pianist), although not really appreciating this "funny" music, was intelligent and open-minded enough to give pupils space and time to use school facilities to practise and listen to the new wave.

Soon after leaving school at 17, McVie trained for nine months to be a tax inspector. This coincided with the start of his musical career.

Career
McVie's first experience making music with a group of like minds was in the back room of a house in Lammas Park Road, Ealing, with his long term friends John Barnes and Peter Barnes who later went on to form a group called The Strangers performing Shadows covers.

McVie's first job as a bass player was in a band called the Krewsaders, formed by boys living in the same street as McVie in Ealing, West London. The Krewsaders played mainly at weddings and parties, covering songs from The Shadows.

McVie is listed at number 37 on Rolling Stone list of 50 greatest bassists.

John Mayall and the Bluesbreakers
Around the time of McVie's tenure as a tax inspector, John Mayall began forming a Chicago-style blues band, John Mayall and the Bluesbreakers. Initially Mayall wanted to recruit bass player Cliff Barton of the Cyril Davies All Stars for the rhythm section of his new band. Barton declined, however, but gave him McVie's phone number, urging Mayall to give the talented young bass player a chance in the Bluesbreakers. Mayall contacted McVie, and asked him to audition for his band. Soon thereafter, McVie got an offer to play bass in the Bluesbreakers. McVie accepted while still holding down his daytime job for a further nine months before becoming a musician full-time. Under Mayall's tutelage, McVie, not having had any formal training in music, learned to play the blues mainly by listening to B.B. King and Willie Dixon records given to him by Mayall. McVie was the band's bassist for four and a half years. During that time he was fired and re-hired several times. 
One of his temporary replacements was Jack Bruce.

Peter Green and Mick Fleetwood
In 1966, a young Peter Green was asked to join Mayall's Bluesbreakers as the band's new lead guitar player, after Eric Clapton, the third guitarist with the band (after Bernie Watson and then Roger Dean), had left. Some time later, after the recording of A Hard Road, drummer Aynsley Dunbar was replaced by Mick Fleetwood. Green, McVie, and Fleetwood quickly forged a strong personal relationship, and when John Mayall gave Green some free studio time for his birthday, Green asked McVie and Fleetwood to join him for a recording session. Produced by Mike Vernon, they recorded three tracks together, "Curly", "Rubber Duck", and an instrumental called "Fleetwood Mac". Later the same year, after having been replaced by Mick Taylor in the Bluesbreakers, Green opted to form his own band, which he called "Fleetwood Mac" after his preferred rhythm section (Fleetwood and McVie). Mick Fleetwood immediately joined Green's new band, having been dismissed earlier from the Bluesbreakers for drunkenness. However, McVie initially was reluctant to join Fleetwood Mac, not wanting to leave the security and well-paid job in the Bluesbreakers, forcing Green to temporarily hire a bassist named Bob Brunning. A few weeks later McVie changed his mind, however, as he felt that The Bluesbreakers musical direction were shifting too much towards jazz, and he joined Fleetwood Mac in September 1967.

Fleetwood Mac

With McVie now in Fleetwood Mac, the band recorded its first album,  Fleetwood Mac, in the following months. The album was released in February 1968, and became an immediate national hit, establishing Fleetwood Mac as a major part in the English Blues movement. Fleetwood Mac started playing live gigs in blues clubs and pubs throughout England, and became a household name in the national blues circuit. In the next three years, the band scored a string of hits in the UK and also enjoyed success in continental Europe.

Christine Perfect
While on tour, Fleetwood Mac would often share venues with fellow blues band Chicken Shack. It was on one such occasion that McVie met his future first wife, the lead singer and piano player of Chicken Shack, Christine Perfect. Following a brief romance of, it has been said, only two weeks, McVie and Perfect got married with Peter Green as best man. With the couple being unable to spend much time together because of the constant touring with their bands, Christine (now McVie) quit Chicken Shack to become a housewife to spend more time with John. However, following the departure of Peter Green from Fleetwood Mac in 1970, McVie successfully persuaded Christine to join him in Fleetwood Mac.

International success and personal life

After 1970, Fleetwood Mac went through several different line-ups, which occasionally became the source of friction and unease within the band. In addition, frequent touring as well as his heavy drinking began to put some strain on his marriage to Christine. In 1974, the McVies, along with the other members of Fleetwood Mac, moved to Los Angeles, where they lived briefly with John Mayall.
In 1975, Fleetwood Mac achieved enormous worldwide success after recruiting American singer-songwriter duo Stevie Nicks and Lindsey Buckingham. However, on the heels of the band's success followed serious marital problems for the McVies, and in 1976, during the recording of Rumours, John and Christine McVie's marriage unravelled and the couple divorced the same year. As a way to put behind the hurt and final dissolution, several of Christine's songs on this album were about John McVie, particularly "Don't Stop". John McVie remarried in 1978 to Julie Ann Reubens, but still continued to drink heavily.
 
In 1981, McVie agreed to go on the road with the Bluesbreakers again for their reunion tour with John Mayall, Mick Taylor, and Colin Allen. During 1982 the band toured America, Asia and Australia (John McVie did not take part in the European Tour in 1983 and was replaced by Steve Thompson).

An alcohol-induced seizure in 1987 finally prompted McVie to stop drinking altogether and he has been sober ever since. In 1989, McVie's wife Julie Ann gave birth to their first child, a daughter, Molly Elizabeth McVie. In his spare time, McVie is a sailing enthusiast, and he nearly got lost at least once on a Pacific voyage. His involvement with Fleetwood Mac has been constant but notably low-key, despite the fact that the band takes the "Mac" part of its name from him.

In October 2013, McVie was diagnosed with colon cancer and began treatment. He continued to play with the band during their 2014 On With The Show tour following an improvement in his condition. In 2017, it was reported that McVie's colon cancer was completely cleared.

Discography

With Fleetwood Mac

With John Mayall's Bluesbreakers

Solo albums

With Lindsey Buckingham and Christine McVie

Songwriting credits for Fleetwood Mac

References

External links

 Fleetwood Mac official website
 

1945 births
Living people
British expatriates in the United States
British rhythm and blues boom musicians
English expatriates in the United States
English rock bass guitarists
Fleetwood Mac members
John Mayall & the Bluesbreakers members
Male bass guitarists
People from Ealing